Kokotović is a Serbian and Croatian surname, derived from the Slavic word kokot, meaning "rooster, cock". Notable people with the surname include:

Petar V. Kokotovic, professor in the Department of Engineering at the University of California
Ljubomir_Kokotović, Serbian artist
Dragoljub Kokotović, Serbian Powerboat racer
Dragan Kokotović, Yugoslav and Croatian footballer
Mirko Kokotović, Croatian football manager, former footballer
Vlada Kokotović, Serbian bassist in Goblini
Misha Kokotovic, American Latin American literature scholar
Joe and Ilija Kokotovic, two brothers of The Croatian Six

See also
Kokot (surname)

Serbian surnames
Croatian surnames